Madizinae is a subfamily of freeloader flies in the family Milichiidae. There are about 8 genera and more than 160 described species in Madizinae.

Genera
These eight genera belong to the subfamily Madizinae:
 Aldrichiomyza Hendel, 1914
 Desmometopa Loew, 1866
 Leptometopa Becker, 1903
 Madiza Fallén, 1810
 Neophyllomyza Melander, 1913
 Paramyia Williston, 1897
 Phyllomyza Fallén, 1810
 Stomosis Melander, 1913

References

Further reading

External links

 

Brachycera subfamilies
Articles created by Qbugbot
Milichiidae